Tihhon Šišov (born 11 February 1983, in Tallinn) is an Estonian footballer, who last played for Maardu Linnameeskond in Estonian Esiliiga.

Position
He plays the position of defender and is 1.73 m tall and weighs 77 kg.

Club career

To Hungary and back
In December 2008 he went on a trial to Nemzeti Bajnokság I side Győri ETO FC and later signed a 3,5-year deal with the club, alongside teammate Tarmo Kink. Only a week later the club wanted to drop the player. Šišov opted against appealing to FIFA as he and the clubs involved found a solution. The contract was mutually terminated and the player returned to Levadia. At the end of the 2009 Meistriliiga season, he declined new contract offers from Levadia as he wanted to test himself outside Estonia.

Feud with Khazar Lankaran
In January 2010, he signed a two-year contract with Azerbaijan Premier League club FK Khazar Lankaran. After half a year and 9 appearances in the league, the club decided to send the player home. Khazar transfer listed the player for around $50,000. This time Šišov asked FIFA for help as the team did not pay the wages nor release the needed papers to join another club, but with no success.

Back to Estonia
The player trained at his old club, FC Levadia Tallinn, until the end of 2010. After that with another Estonian club JK Nõmme Kalju, although still unable to play competitive club football. He eventually signed a one-year contract with the club on 6 February 2012, after almost 400 days of "trial". He made the league debut for the club on 10 March 2012, in a goalless draw against city rivals FC Levadia Tallinn.

International career
Šišov has played 40 international games for the Estonia national football team. Despite the fact that he didn't play club football for almost two years due to contract issues in Azerbaijan, he regularly featured in Tarmo Rüütli's team during that time.

Career statistics

Club

Honours

Club
 FC Levadia Tallinn
 Estonian Top Division: 2000, 2004, 2006, 2007, 2008, 2009
 runners up: 2005
 Estonian Cup: 2000, 2002, 2004, 2005, 2007
 Estonian SuperCup
 runners up: 2004, 2005, 2007
 Maardu Linnameeskond
 Estonian Second Division: 2017, 2018

References

External links
 
 
 

1983 births
Living people
Footballers from Tallinn
Estonian footballers
Estonia international footballers
Estonian people of Russian descent
FCI Levadia Tallinn players
Khazar Lankaran FK players
Nõmme Kalju FC players
Estonian expatriate footballers
Expatriate footballers in Azerbaijan
Estonian expatriate sportspeople in Azerbaijan
FC Puuma Tallinn players
Association football defenders
Maardu Linnameeskond players
Meistriliiga players